Shikhar is an Indian masculine given name. Notable people with the name include:

Shikhar Dhawan (born 1985), Indian cricketer
Shikhar Ghimirey (born 1987), Nepali writer
Shikhar Ghosh, Indian entrepreneur 

Indian masculine given names